The Sports Emmy Award for Outstanding Live Sports Series has been awarded since 1976. Unlike the award for Outstanding Live Sports Special, this award is given to networks for a weekly series in which a specific sport is televised live.

List of winners
1975-76: Monday Night Football (ABC)
1976-77: The NFL Today/NFL on CBS (CBS)
1977-78: The NFL Today/NFL on CBS (CBS)
1978-79: Monday Night Football (ABC)
1979-80: College Football on ABC (ABC)
1980-81: PGA Golf Tour (CBS)
1981-82: NFL on CBS (CBS)
1982-83: NFL on CBS (CBS)
1983-84: no award was given
1984-85: no award was given
1985-86: no award was given
1986-87: NFL on CBS (CBS)
1987-88: Monday Night Football (ABC)
1988: CBS's coverage of the 1988 NCAA Division I men's basketball tournament (CBS)
1989: Monday Night Football (ABC)
1990: CBS's coverage of the 1990 NCAA Division I men's basketball tournament (CBS)
1991: CBS's coverage of the 1991 NCAA Division I men's basketball tournament (CBS)
1992: CBS's coverage of the 1992 NCAA Division I men's basketball tournament (CBS)
1993: Monday Night Football (ABC)
1994: Monday Night Football (ABC)
1995: ESPN SpeedWorld (ESPN)
1996: ESPN SpeedWorld (ESPN)
1997: Monday Night Football (ABC)
1998: NBC Golf Tour (NBC)
1999: Major League Baseball on Fox regular season coverage (FOX)
2000: ESPN Sunday Night Football (ESPN)
2001: NASCAR on Fox (FOX)
2002: The NBA on NBC (NBC)
2003: ESPN Sunday Night Football (ESPN)
2004: Monday Night Football (ABC)
 ESPN Sunday Night Football (ESPN)
 INDY Racing League (ABC/ESPN)
 MLB on Fox (FOX)
2005: NASCAR on Fox (FOX)
 ESPN College Football (ESPN)
 ESPN Sunday Night Football (ESPN)
 Monday Night Football (ABC)
 NFL on CBS (CBS)
2006: NASCAR on NBC / TNT (NBC/TNT)
 ESPN College Football (ESPN)
 ESPN Major League Baseball (ESPN)
 HBO PPV Boxing (HBO)
 Monday Night Football (ESPN)
2007: NASCAR on Fox (FOX)
 Monday Night Football (ESPN)
 NBA on ESPN (ESPN) / NBA on ABC (ABC)
 NBC Golf Tour (NBC)
 NBC Sunday Night Football (NBC)
 NFL on Fox (FOX)
2008: NBC Sunday Night Football (NBC)
 ESPN College Football (ABC)
 Monday Night Football (ESPN)
 NASCAR on Fox (FOX)
 NASCAR on TNT Summer Series (TNT)
2009: NBC Sunday Night Football (NBC)
 College Football on CBS (CBS)
 Grand Slam Tennis on ESPN (ESPN)
 NASCAR on TNT Summer Series (TNT)
 PGA Tour on CBS (CBS)
2010: NBC Sunday Night Football (NBC)
 ESPN College Football (ESPN)
 Monday Night Football (ESPN)
 NASCAR on Fox (FOX) / NASCAR on Speed (Speed)
 NFL on Fox (FOX)
2011: NBC Sunday Night Football (NBC)
 HBO WCB/PPV Boxing (HBO)
 MLB on Fox (FOX)
 Monday Night Football (ESPN)
 NBA on TNT (TNT)
2012: NBC Sunday Night Football (NBC)
 Monday Night Football (ESPN)
 NASCAR on Fox (FOX) / NASCAR on Speed (Speed)
 NBA on TNT (TNT)
 NFL on Fox (FOX)
2013: NBC Sunday Night Football (NBC)
 ESPN College Football (ABC)
 HBO Boxing (HBO)
 Monday Night Football (ESPN)
 SEC on CBS (CBS)
2014: NASCAR on Fox (FOX/Fox Sports 1)
 ESPN College Football (ABC/ESPN/SEC Network)
 Monday Night Football (ESPN)
 NBC Sunday Night Football (NBC)
2015: NBC Sunday Night Football (NBC)
 ESPN College Football (ESPN/ABC)
 NASCAR on Fox (FOX/Fox Sports 1)
 NFL on Fox (FOX)
 Thursday Night Football (CBS/NFL Network)
2016: NBC Sunday Night Football (NBC)
 ESPN College Football (ESPN/ABC)
 Monday Night Football (ESPN)
 NASCAR on Fox (FOX/Fox Sports 1)
 NFL on Fox (FOX)
2017: NBC Sunday Night Football (NBC)
 NASCAR on Fox (FOX/FS1)
 NBA on TNT (TNT)
 NFL on Fox (FOX)
 Thursday Night Football (NBC/NFL Network)
2018: NBC Sunday Night Football (NBC)
 ESPN Major League Baseball (ESPN)
 Golf Channel on NBC (NBC)
 NFL on CBS (CBS)
 SEC on CBS (CBS)

Multiple wins
10 wins
NBC Sunday Night Football

8 wins
Monday Night Football

5 wins
NFL on CBS

4 wins
CBS's coverage of the NCAA Division I men's basketball tournament
NASCAR on Fox

2 wins
ESPN SpeedWorld
ESPN Sunday Night Football
The NFL Today

Sports Emmy Awards